Anselm Knuuttila (February 1, 1903 – June 29, 1968) was a Finnish cross-country skier who competed in the late 1920s. He won a pair of medals at the 1929 FIS Nordic World Ski Championships in Zakopane, earning a gold in the 50 km and a silver in the 17 km event.

Cross-country skiing results
All results are sourced from the International Ski Federation (FIS).

World Championships
 2 medals – (1 gold, 1 silver)

References

External links

Finnish ski federation profile 

1903 births
1968 deaths
Finnish male cross-country skiers
FIS Nordic World Ski Championships medalists in cross-country skiing